Warrensfield is a townland in Athlone, County Westmeath, Ireland. The townland is in the civil parish of St. Mary's.

The townland stands in the centre of the town. A section of the Athlone to Mullingar Cycleway passes through the area. The townland is bordered by Athlone to the west, Cloghanboy (Homan) to the north and east and Curragh (Mechum) to the south.

References 

Townlands of County Westmeath